Patrice Estanguet (born 19 April 1973 in Pau) is a French slalom canoeist who competed at the international level from 1990 to 2004. He is the older brother of triple Olympic champion Tony Estanguet.

Career
Patrice Estanguet won a bronze medal in the C1 event at the 1996 Summer Olympics in Atlanta.

He also won four medals at the ICF Canoe Slalom World Championships with two silvers (C1 team: 1997, 2003) and two bronzes (C1: 2002, C1 team: 1999).

He won the overall World Cup title in the C1 class in 1996 and 1997.

World Cup individual podiums

References

External links 
 

1973 births
Canoeists at the 1996 Summer Olympics
French male canoeists
Living people
Olympic canoeists of France
Olympic bronze medalists for France
Olympic medalists in canoeing
Medalists at the 1996 Summer Olympics
Medalists at the ICF Canoe Slalom World Championships
Sportspeople from Pau, Pyrénées-Atlantiques